Electrona may refer to:

 Electrona (fish), a genus of lanternfishes in the family Myctophidae
 Electrona, Tasmania, a town in Tasmania, Australia